Keyvan Rafiee  is a former prisoner of conscience and was arrested six times for his activities starting in 2003. He is one of the founders of Human Rights Activists in Iran (HRAI).

Activities and Detentions 
Keyvan Rafiee was first arrested by the Ministry of Intelligence and Security (MOIS) for protesting the election process of the Assembly of Experts in Gorgan city in Golestan Province due to what believed to be questioning the authority of the Supreme Leader's representative and the President of Azad University. He was kept in detention for 13 days and when released, was denied the right to return to the university and continue his education. 
Rafiee continued his activities and in 2004 was arrested during the anniversary of student protests in July 9; for one month he was kept in temporary detention center, ward 209 of the MOIS in Evin Prison and before being released on bail. 
Keyvan Rafiee was once again arrested on May 23, 2005, less than a year later, charged with activities aimed at boycotting the ninth Presidential Elections, when the disputed elections brought Mahmood Ahmadinejad to power for the first term. He spends most of his detention in solitary confinement and then was incarcerated in ward 209 of the MOIS in Evin Prison, at the end he was released on bail until his trial. The accusations finally led to a year of imprisonment which was then suspended for three years. 
For the fourth time, this human right activist was arrested in front of Tehran University on the anniversary of December 7 [National Student's Day] only a few days after being released; this time he was kept in detention for a short while and was released on bail at the same night. 
In 2006, Keyvan Rafiee founded the Human Right Activists in Iran along with Jamal Hosseini. However, only a few months after starting this organization, he was arrested on May 1 by the security police as he was protesting among the workers of Tehran Bus Driver's Union on the International Workers' Day; he was beaten by police forces at the time of arrest but was released later on because he used an alias. 
Mr. Rafiee's last arrest was recorded on July 9, 2006, due to the latest policy of the MOIS for arresting individuals with detention records and under the pretext of crime prevention without providing any particular charge; since the Ministry was concerned about activists organizing and taking part in protests in front of Tehran University. He was then transferred to ward 209 of Evin Prison even though he had not been charged with a crime where he spent 183 days in solitary confinement.
Following this period he was transferred to open prison and other wards of Evin Prison. After 15 months, this human right activist, charged with actions against national security, was put into trial and sentenced by Judge Salavati; considering the time he had already spent in prison, he was finally released on December 22, 2007. 
After gaining his freedom and as he was once again summoned to the revolutionary court, he left Iran and sought political asylum in the United States.

Activities in the Human Rights Activists in Iran (HRAI) 
Keyvan Rafiee is one of the founders of the Human Rights Activists in Iran (HRAI) along with Jamal Hosseini and Mahdi Khodaei. In the past decade, he has taken up various roles at HRAI, including the Spokesman and director, taking on a range of executive activities in this human rights organization.
Mr. Rafiee is the author of a number of articles and books, including the following:

 Article - “A Critical Review on the Report by Ahmed Shahid, United nation’s Human Rights Rapporteur” – published in Peace Mark Monthly – 2011
 Annual Listing of Iranian political prisoners – from 2009 to 2014
 Pamphlet titled “Behind the Curtains of Social Welfare” - 2009
 Book titled “An Autopsy of Human Rights” on human rights education– 2008
 Research Booklet titled “From Prison to Prison” about security and secret prisons in Iran – 2008
 Booklet titled “The Nest of Corruption” about widespread corruption in Iranian prisons – 2008

Additionally, Rafiee has established connections with various groups and reported on many issues concerning Iran’s ethnic and religious minorities, workers, labor unionists, and political activists. He has trained staff, authored comprehensive reports and articles, established Committee for Opposing Censorship, established bilingual (Persian and English) websites, established coalitions with other non-profit and human rights organizations around the globe, Founded Peace Mark, a monthly publication dedicated to human rights and political analysis, established and conducted Annual Statistical Analysis of human rights violations in Iran, used by major organizations around the world. He has also worked with United Nations, U.S. State Department, U.S. Congress, and other non-governmental organizations to raise awareness about human rights violations in Iran.

Attacks by the Islamic Revolutionary Guards Corps (IRGC) 
As the impact of civil rights and human rights reporting became apparent and the HRAI’s activities became known, Keyvan Rafiee became a target for IRGC Intelligence Unit who sought to make such activities costly by destroying the reputation and livelihood of HRAI’s members. 
During the people’s uprising, in the aftermath of the disputed 2009 presidential elections, HRAI was central in collecting and reporting vital evidence against widespread human rights violations in Iran. The IRGC Intelligence Unit broadcast videos and propaganda pieces, to try to establish that the group is related to “anti-revolutionary” groups and outside forces, which the group and Keyvan Rafiee have repeatedly denied, maintaining that it is non-political and non-partisan.

See also 
 Human Rights Activists in Iran
 Hrana

References 
 Europe parliamentary statement about Keyvan Rafiee
 Radio Farda report about rafiee
 Radio Farda report about rafiee
 Etemad newspaper report on Keyvan Rafiee
 Radio Farda report
 Radio Farda report
 Amnesty International Statement
 Amnesty International Statement
 Europe parliamentary statement
 BBC report
 Keyvan Rafiee interview with Voice of America
 Keyvan Rafiee and Seyed Jamal Hosseini Interview
 one of the IRCG video against Keyvan Rafiee
 Keyvan Rafiee interview about Jamal Hosseini death

External links 
 
 HRANA website

Amnesty International prisoners of conscience held by Iran
Iranian democracy activists
Iranian bloggers
Iranian dissidents
Iranian human rights activists
Iranian prisoners and detainees
Living people
Iranian journalists
Year of birth missing (living people)